Boletellus jalapensis is a species of fungus in the family Boletaceae. Originally described under the name Ceriomyces jalapensis by William Alphonso Murrill in 1910, it was transferred to the genus Boletellus in 1931. It is known from Mexico and Costa Rica.

References

Fungi of North America
Fungi of Central America
jalapensis
Fungi described in 1910